The Sardinian Socialist Action Party (PSd'AzS) was a regionalist social-democratic political party active in Sardinia.

History
The party was founded in 1948 by a split from the Sardinian Action Party led by Emilio Lussu, former member of the "Sassari brigade" during the Italian resistance movement. The party won 6.6% in the first regional election in 1949 and shortly after merged with the Italian Socialist Party, a party of which Lussu was a senator until 1963.

References

1948 establishments in Italy
Defunct social democratic parties in Italy
Political parties established in 1948
Political parties in Sardinia
Political parties with year of disestablishment missing